The Deputy Speaker(s) of the Grand National Assembly of Turkey (Turkish: Türkiye Büyük Millet Meclisi Başkanvekilleri) serve on the Speakers Council (Turkish: Başkanlık Divanı) in the Grand National Assembly, the unicameral Parliament of the Turkish Republic. There are four Deputy Speakers, selected according to the parliamentary composition of the incumbent Parliament. Unlike the Speaker of the Grand National Assembly, the Deputy Speakers are not elected by MPs. Instead, each party who has enough representation to nominate a Deputy Speaker can do so, with their nomination automatically becoming official. However, parties can also hold elections within their parliamentary groups to determine their Deputy Speaker.

In the current 27th Parliament of Turkey, there are five parties with representation but only four obtained the right to a Deputy Speaker. The governing Justice and Development Party (AKP) nominated two deputies, namely Süreyya Sadi Bilgiç. The Republican People's Party (CHP) nominated Haydar Akar and the Peoples' Democratic Party (HDP) nominated Nimetullah Erdoğmuş. The National Movement Party (MHP) nominated Celal Adan. The Good Party (İYİ), holding 43 seats, was not eligible to select a deputy.

Current deputy speakers
The current Deputy Speakers for the 27th Parliament of Turkey:

List of former Deputy Speakers

See also
Grand National Assembly of Turkey
Speaker of the Grand National Assembly

References

External links
List of Deputy Speakers on the Parliament website

Political office-holders in Turkey
Deputy Speakers of the Grand National Assembly of Turkey